The Oto Melara 127/64 Lightweight (LW) naval gun mount is a rapid-fire gun mount suitable for installation on large and medium size ships.  It also has a version for coastal defense, intended for surface fire and naval gunfire support as main role and anti-aircraft fire as secondary role. The compactness of the gun feeding system makes installation on narrow section crafts possible.

The gun can fire all standard 127 mm (5 inch) ammunition including Vulcano long range guided ammunition.

Modular automatic feeding magazines allow the firing of up to four different and immediately selectable types of ammunition; the magazines (four drums, each with one shell ready to fire and 13 other ammunitions on store) can be reloaded while the mount is in operation.

An ammunition manipulator system is available to transport projectiles and propelling charges from the main ammunition store to the feeding magazines, which are automatically reloaded. Ammunition flow is reversible. Rounds can be automatically unloaded from the gun. Digital and analog interfaces are available for any Combat Management System, also according to COBRA protocol.

The 127/64 LW naval gun mounts includes a Vulcano module, which acts twofold:
 Programmer for ammunition's fuse and guidance system.
 Mission Planning and Execution for Naval Fire Support Action (firing solutions, selection of ammunition, definition of trajectories and firing sequences, ballistic computations accounting for ammunition type, etc.), as a standalone or in interaction with ship's Network Centric System.

Operators

Current operators

 2 × Erradii class frigates

 4 ×  and 1 used for training
 4 × F126 frigate (4 planned)

 4 × FREMM multipurpose frigate (6 planned)
 7 × Thaon di Revel class Offshore Patrol Vessel

2 × FREMM multipurpose class frigate (2 in option)

Future operators

 5 × F-110 class frigate

 4 × De Zeven Provinciën class frigate Ordered April 2020, will replace current 127mm in 2023–2025

15 × Canadian Surface Combatant

See also 
 Otobreda 127/54 Compact

Notes

External links 
 Information sheet on Oto Melara website
 Oto Melara Introduces Vulcano 76mm Derivative Defense-Update

Naval guns of Italy
Post–Cold War weapons of Germany
127 mm artillery
Military equipment introduced in the 2010s

ja:オート・メラーラ 127 mm 砲